Coreius heterodon is a species of ray-finned fish in the genus Coreius found in China and Korea.

References

Coreius
Cyprinid fish of Asia
Freshwater fish of China
Fish described in 1864